This is a list of wineries in New Mexico. Within American wine, New Mexico has a long history of wine production, especially along the Rio Grande, from its capital Santa Fe, the city of Albuquerque with its surrounding metropolitan area, and in valleys like the Mesilla and the Mimbres River valleys. In 1629, Franciscan friar García de Zúñiga and a Capuchín monk named Antonio de Arteaga planted the first wine grapes in Santa Fe de Nuevo México, in what would become the modern Middle Rio Grande Valley AVA. Today, wineries exist in the aforementioned Middle Rio Grande Valley, as well as the Mesilla Valley AVA and the Mimbres Valley AVA.

Central New Mexico

Acequia Vineyards & Winery, Corrales
Anasazi Fields, Placitas
Anderson Valley Vineyards, Albuquerque
Bees Brothers Winery, Albuquerque
Black's Smuggler Winery, Bosque
Casa Rondeña Winery, Los Ranchos de Albuquerque
Corrales Winery, Corrales
Gruet Winery, Albuquerque
Guadalupe Vineyards, San Fidel
Milagro Vineyards, Corrales
Ponderosa Valley Vineyards & Winery, Ponderosa

Northern New Mexico
Black Mesa Winery, Velarde
La Chiripada Winery, Dixon
Santa Fe Vineyards, Santa Fe
Vivác Winery, Embudo
Wine's of the San Juan, Turley

Southeastern New Mexico
Balzano Winery, Carlsbad
Dos Viejos Winery, Tularosa
Noisy Water Winery, Ruidoso
Pecos Flavors Winery, Roswell
Tularosa Vineyards, Tularosa

Southwestern New Mexico
Amaro Winery, Las Cruces
Black Range Winery and Vintage Wines, Mesilla
La Viña Winery, La Union
Luna Rossa Winery, Deming
Rio Grande Vineyards & Winery, Las Cruces
St. Clair Winery, Deming

See also

List of breweries in New Mexico
List of vineyards and wineries
New Mexico wine

References

Citations

Works cited

Further reading

External links
New Mexico Wine Growers Association

 
Wineries
Wineries
New Mexico
Wineries
Wineries
New Mexico